is a train station located in Chūō-ku, Fukuoka. Watanabe-dōri(:ja:渡辺通り) means Mr.Watanabe's avenue in Japanese, because to commemorate ) makes efforts to establish the tram line on here in 1911. This station's symbol mark is a tram that used to run here.

Lines

Platforms

External links
 Watanabe-dōri Station 

Railway stations in Fukuoka Prefecture
Railway stations in Fukuoka, Fukuoka